For the Bermudian former cricketer, see Stacey Simmons.

Stacey Simmons (born August 5, 1968) is a former American football wide receiver. He played for the Indianapolis Colts in 1990.

References

1968 births
Living people
Sportspeople from Clearwater, Florida
Players of American football from Florida
American football wide receivers
Florida Gators football players
Indianapolis Colts players